Sonoma Coast State Marine Conservation Area is a protected area along the coast of northern California, part of the North Central Coast Study Region.

It is bounded by the mean high tide line, the 3-fathom depth contour, and several points along  of coast between Mussel Point and Schoolhouse Beach in Sonoma County.

Within this Area, the recreational taking of all marine aquatic plants and some invertebrates is prohibited.  Commercial taking of giant kelp and bull kelp is also prohibited.

See also 
 Sonoma Coast State Park

References

External links 
 locator map
 closeup map

Marine sanctuaries in California
California Department of Fish and Wildlife areas
Protected areas of Sonoma County, California